Elektrozavodsky (m), Elektrozavodskoye (n), Elektrozavodskaya (f) can mean the following:

 Elektrozavodskaya (Arbatsko-Pokrovskaya line)
 Elektrozavodskaya (Bolshaya Koltsevaya line)
 Elektrozavodskaya railway station
 Elektrozavodskaya Street (Moscow)
 Elektrozavodskaya (Kryvyi Rih Metro)